The following list is a list of mascots of NPB (Nippon Professional Baseball) teams:

References 

Nippon Professional Baseball
Baseball team mascots
Lists of mascots